Filthy Casual is a clothing brand and online community for gamers and content creators, based out of Edmonton, Alberta and Orlando, Florida. The brand was started by Mike Gaboury and Jason Soprovich in 2009.

History
Filthy Casual began as Cherry Sauce Clothing, a small run of t-shirts sold exclusively to friends of Mike and Jason. The first online store opened on July 24, 2009. The early shirt designs featured cartoony artwork created by Mike and other outsourced artists. 

After several iterations and changes to the brand's overall image, the two decided to focus on gaming culture. During a stream on Twitch hosted by Mike and Jason, a chat participant called the founders "filthy casuals," which they found charming, despite usually being used as a derogatory term. 

After designing a logo, the brand launched their first line of 100 Filthy Casual shirts in November 2013. The shirts quickly outsold and overshadowed the old Cherry Sauce designs. After slowly phasing out the older style of designs, Jason and Mike decided to officially rebrand the company as Filthy Casual in June 2015.

Collaborations
At TwitchCon 2015, Twitch partners were able to get a limited edition collaboration shirt between Filthy Casual and Deep Silver.

In March 2016, there was another collaboration shirt between Filthy Casual and Rooster Teeth.

References

Clothing manufacturers
Video game culture